Pseudopostega pontifex is a moth of the family Opostegidae. It was described by Edward Meyrick in 1915. It is known from Cali, Colombia.

The length of the forewings is about 2.7 mm. Adults have been recorded in May.

References

Opostegidae
Moths described in 1915